Great Fish River Nature Reserve is a nature reserve in Eastern Cape Province, South Africa that is managed by Eastern Cape Parks.
The park has a total area of 45,000 ha, and has been operational since 1994. It comprises three historical nature reserves that have been combined into a single reserve: 
 Andries Vosloo Kudu Reserve
 Double Drift Nature Reserve
 Sam Knott Nature Reserve
The reserves are linked by a circular route, and the Great Fish River runs through the park.

See also

References

External links 
 Eastern Cape Parks

Eastern Cape Provincial Parks
Protected areas of the Eastern Cape
Protected areas established in 1994
1994 establishments in South Africa